Methyl lactate, also known as lactic acid methyl ester, is the organic compound with the formula CH3CH(OH)CO2CH3. It is the methyl ester of lactic acid.  A colorless liquid, it is the simplest chiral ester.  Being naturally derived, it is readily available as a single enantiomer.

Uses
It is a solvent for nitrocellulose, cellulose acetate, cellulose acetobutyrate and cellulose acetopropionate. It is used in the manufacture of lacquers and dopes where it contributes high tolerance for diluents, good flaw and blush resistance.

The synthesis of 1,2-propanediol from methyl lactate has been commercialized using a MACHO catalyst.

See also
Ethyl lactate, a more commonly used ester of lactic acid

References

Lactate esters
Methyl esters
Ester solvents